Angela Deanne Bjorklund (born July 14, 1989) is a retired a women's NCAA basketball player for the Tennessee Lady Vols. Bjorklund is a former American professional basketball player for the Chicago Sky drafted in the 2011 WNBA draft. Her older sister, Jami, was a Forward for Kelly Graves' Gonzaga Bulldogs women's basketball team from 2005 to 2009, playing alongside Sky teammate at the time; Courtney Vandersloot.

High school 
Bjorklund was named a WBCA All-American. She participated in the 2007 WBCA High School All-America Game, where she scored eleven points.

USA Basketball
Bjorklund was a member of the USA Women's U19 team which won the gold medal at the FIBA U19 World Championship in Bratislava, Slovakia. The event was held in July and August 2007, when the USA team defeated Sweden to win the championship. Bjorklund helped the team the gold medal, scoring 7.4 points per game.

College Basketball Career
Bjorklund became the 10th Lady Vols freshman to start their basketball career in the starting lineup. She played all 38 games during her freshman season, where Tennessee won the National Championship against Stanford by a final score of 64–48, earning Pat Summitt her eighth and eventually, final National Championship as head coach. Bjorklund finished her college career with 300 pointers, becoming the Lady Vols all-time 3 points record, which was previously held by Shanna Zolman, who had 266 3-pointers in her career.

Tennessee statistics
Source

Post Basketball Career
Bjorklund was hired as the Director of Basketball Operations position prior to the 2013–14 season under Jennifer Mountain, who was assistant coach during her sister Jami's freshman, sophomore, and junior years at Gonzaga.

References

1989 births
Living people
American women's basketball players
Basketball players from Spokane, Washington
Chicago Sky draft picks
Chicago Sky players
Parade High School All-Americans (girls' basketball)
People from Spokane Valley, Washington
Point guards
Tarbes Gespe Bigorre players
Tennessee Lady Volunteers basketball players